Yulinzhou or Yulin Prefecture was a zhou (prefecture) in imperial China in modern southern Guangxi, China. It existed from 666 to 1912, and between 742 and 758 it was known as Yulin Commandery.

References

 
 
 

Prefectures of the Tang dynasty
Prefectures of Southern Han
Guangnan West Circuit
Prefectures of the Yuan dynasty
Prefectures of the Ming dynasty
Prefectures of the Qing dynasty
Former prefectures in Guangxi
666 establishments
7th-century establishments in China
1912 disestablishments in China